Anders Emil Nedrebø (born 19 August 1988) is a retired Norwegian footballer who played as a defender. His last club was Vålerenga which he left ahead of the 2017 season.

Career statistics

References

1988 births
Living people
Sportspeople from Bærum
Bærum SK players
Asker Fotball players
Hamarkameratene players
Vålerenga Fotball players
Eliteserien players
Norwegian First Division players
Association football defenders
Norwegian footballers